Boneh Kaghi (also Romanized as Boneh Kāghī; also known asBīnā Keyājī, Binakiagi, and Byanekyagi) is a village in Ozomdel-e Shomali Rural District, in the Central District of Varzaqan County, East Azerbaijan Province, Iran. At the 2006 census, its population was 162, in 27 families.

References 

Towns and villages in Varzaqan County